The 1905 Northwestern Purple football team represented Northwestern University during the 1905 Western Conference football season. Walter McCornack, in his third season at Northwestern, was the team's head coach. The Purple's home games were played at the new Northwestern Field in Evanston, Illinois. They were members of the Western Conference. They finished the season 8–2–1, and 0–2 in Western Conference play.

Schedule

Regular season

Evanston High School

North Division High School

St. Viateur's Academy

Wabash

Beloit

Kentucky

Chicago

Marquette

Ohio Northern

Michigan Agricultural

Minnesota

Roster

References

External links

Northwestern
Northwestern Wildcats football seasons
Northwestern Purple football